Countdown—Time in Outer Space  is a studio album released by the Dave Brubeck Quartet in 1962 on Columbia LP record CS 8575 (stereo) and CL 1775 (mono).  The front cover features the 1959 painting Orange and Black Wall by Franz Kline.  In Australia the album appeared on the Coronet label.  It was re-released, for the first time in digital format, in 2004 as part of a compact disc collection titled Dave Brubeck: For All Time.  It was again released as part of the box set The Dave Brubeck Quartet: the Columbia Studio Albums Collection 1955-1966.  Both CD re-releases feature a bonus track titled "Fatha".

Recording
Dedicated to astronaut John Glenn the album was another in a series of concept albums studying the exploration of unusual meters and polytonality within a jazz context. Recorded between May 3, 1961 and February 12, 1962, it was put on tape in many of the same sessions that appear on Time Further Out. Brubeck encouraged the quartet members towards the development of new time signatures for this album. The first track, "Countdown", is based on a typical "8 to the bar" boogie, stride piano in the manner of Earl Hines or Teddy Wilson, but with two extra notes added in, giving a meter count of 10. AC/DC's song Whole Lotta Rosie has an opening riff directly mimicking this track. Michael Katzif considers the track so smoothly played that some people may be unaware of the unusual time signature. "Eleven Four" uses a pattern of five beats, then two sets of three to create the feel of eleven. The next four tracks, "Fast Life," "Waltz Limp," "Three's a Crowd," and "Danse Duet" were written for a ballet entitled "Maiden in the Tower." Different characters in the performance have themes with different time signatures, and as they interact the interplay and contrasts of the various rhythms are paraded. The album's final track, as originally issued, is a standard blues in 4/4 time, hence the title "Back to Earth."

Reception
On release, Billboard expected the album to be "another smash" because of the "persuasive and exciting performances".  Both the monaural and stereo version appeared on the respective Billboard charts.  Countdown's first appearance on the Billboard chart was on June 16, 1962.  It reached a peak position of No. 24 and remained on the chart for 21 weeks.  The St. Petersburg Times called the album "modern jazz at its finest."  Louise Stone recommended the album but found it inferior to Brubeck's Fantasy recordings and Jazz Goes to College.  The album has been cited as a superior example of utilizing "off" time signatures. The Age stated that the album "breaks new ground." The Seattle Post-Intelligencer called it one of Brubeck's most creative records.

Track listing

CD bonus track

Personnel
 Dave Brubeck – piano
 Paul Desmond – alto saxophone
 Eugene Wright – bass
 Joe Morello – drums

References

1962 albums
Columbia Records albums
Instrumental albums
Dave Brubeck albums
Albums produced by Teo Macero